Butugychag was a tin, gold and uranium mine and a former forced labour camp in the Kolyma region of North-Eastern Russia, present-day Magadan Oblast.

Forced Labor Camp
The Butugychag Corrective Labor Camp was part of the bigger Berlag, a subdivision of GULAG. The camp existed during 1945–1955 . The camp is mostly known for its deadly uranium extraction. It is mentioned by some Russian historians such as Anatoly Zhigulin. It is one of a small number of camps where prisoners mined uranium, the truth of which has only recently been recovered.

The camp's main activity was the mining of various types of ore, including tin, gold, and uranium. The camp also contained a top secret research-medical facility where a series of experiments were conducted on camp inmates. Witnesses of the camp state that the camp took the life of some 380,000 people in the 10 years of its existence, despite a maximum capacity of 31,500 only having been reached in 1952. Uranium mining was conducted manually without any protective gear, resulting in severe occupational risks to prisoners. The average miner's life span was less than a year, and radiation levels in the area are still elevated. The administration of the Tenkinsky District installed warning signs around the area as a precaution against trespassers.

Legend
In local folklore, the area is known as Death Valley. This name was given to the area by the nomadic tribes that domesticated and raised deer in the area. As they travelled along the Detrin River, they stumbled upon a huge field filled with human skulls and bones. Soon after, their deer became ill with a mysterious disease; the first symptom was loss of fur on their legs, followed by lack of energy and refusal to walk. This name was passed on to Beria's camps of the 14th department of GULAG.

The settlement has only recently come to light, and is not even listed among the abandoned camps as though it never existed. There are two abandoned settlements in the area located near each other (10 kilometres): Butugychag was the camp itself where prisoners were kept, and Lower Butugychag, which housed the servicemen of the local electric substation. In 1955 when the camp was shut down, Lower Butugychag was abandoned and its population was moved to Ust-Omchug.

Located nearby (8 kilometres) is an abandoned chicken farm, which was left uncompleted and under construction due to the high concentration of radiation.

All the roads to the area have deteriorated, making it difficult to find the settlement and, thus, to reach it. The only practical way to get to the area is by a cross-country vehicle or by air transportation.

Gallery

See also
Kolyma

References

External links
 A uranium mine on the Kolyma River
 The ruins of a uranium mining Russian prison camp
 Anatoliy Zhygulin, survivor-poet, writes about the camp 
 Walkthrough overview of the camp in 2008 by Vysokyi Val correspondent 
 Historical and geographical sites of Kolyma region overview 
 Mentioning of Butugychag
 Valley of Death by gulag.ipvnews.org/
 Picture of Butugychag

Camps of the Gulag
Buildings and structures in Magadan Oblast
Human subject research in Russia
Uranium mines in the Soviet Union
Gold mines in the Soviet Union